is a Japanese women's professional shogi player ranked 2-dan.

Women's shogi professional

Promotion history
Murata's promotion history is as follows:
 2-kyū: April 1, 2002
 1-kyū: April 1, 2003
 1-dan: April 1, 2004
 2-dan: February 10, 2011

Note: All ranks are women's professional ranks.

Personal life
Murata's older brother Tomohiro is also a shogi professional. The two were the first brother and sister pair to become shogi professionals.

References

External links
 ShogiHub: Murata, Chiho
 blogs:
 かんふぁたぶるブログ
 お気楽ブログ

Japanese shogi players
Living people
Women's professional shogi players
Professional shogi players from Hyōgo Prefecture
People from Takasago, Hyōgo
1984 births